Austin Krajicek and John-Patrick Smith were the defending champions, but Smith did not participate this year. Krajicek partnered with Nicholas Monroe, but lost in the quarterfinals to Yuki Bhambri and Michael Venus.

Treat Huey and Frederik Nielsen won the tournament, defeating Bhambri and Venus in the final.

Seeds

Draw

References
 Main Draw

Odlum Brown Vancouver Open
Vancouver Open